Comedy King (1907–1929) was a British bred thoroughbred racehorse that raced his entire career in Australia.  He is most notable for winning the 1910 Melbourne Cup and becoming the first Northern-Hemisphere bred horse to do so.

Background

Comedy King was owned by Sol Green, one of Australia's biggest bookmakers and one of the country's richest men.  On a trip to England in 1906 Green bought some racehorses and among them was the broodmare Tragedy Queen, which was in foal to the 1896 English Derby winner and legendary racehorse Persimmon.
After the foal was weaned it was exported to Australia where it was to race for Green under the name Comedy King.

Racing career

Comedy King won eight races in his career, with his most famous victory being the 1910 Melbourne Cup.  Starting at the odds of 10/1 he won by a margin of a 1/2 neck carrying 7st 11 lb (49.5 kg) and collected first prize money of £6,178.

Stud career

Comedy King retired from racing in 1912 and commenced stud duties at owner Sol Green's Shipley Stud near Warrnambool, Victoria.  When the stud was dispersed in 1918, Comedy King was secured by pastoralist Norman Falkiner for 7,300 guineas.   Comedy King had great success as a sire, producing the 1919 Melbourne Cup winner Artilleryman and the 1922 Cup winner, King Ingoda.   He was also crowned Australian Champion stallion in 1920 and 1923.

Comedy King died in December 1929 and was buried at Falkiner's Noorilim Stud.   A few months after his death, Comedy King's remains were exhumed and his bones sent to be displayed at the newly formed Australian Institute of Anatomy. However, it's unknown if Comedy King's skeleton was ever assembled, and as recently as 2013 an attempt was made to match up boxes of equine bones at the institute to see if the horse could be “put back together”.

Pedigree

References 

Australian racehorses
Racehorses bred in the United Kingdom
Racehorses trained in Australia
1907 racehorse births
1929 racehorse deaths
Thoroughbred family 7-e
Melbourne Cup winners